Hohenwarth-Mühlbach am Manhartsberg is a municipality in the district of Hollabrunn in Lower Austria, Austria.

Geography
Hohenwarth-Mühlbach lies in the Weinviertel in Lower Austria. About 29.87 percent of the municipality is forested. The Gießgraben has its source near Hohenwarth.

References

Cities and towns in Hollabrunn District